The 2013 NRL season was the 106th season of professional rugby league club competition in Australia. The National Rugby League's main competition, named the 2013 Telstra Premiership after major sponsors Telstra Corporation, was contested by sixteen teams during the regular season, which lasted from March to September, and resulted in the top eight finishing teams, who went on to contest the finals. The season culminated in the Grand Final, in which the Sydney Roosters defeated the Manly-Warringah Sea Eagles 26-18 to win their first NRL premiership since 2002.

The NRL season started with the 2013 NRL All Stars match, which was played in February. The 2013 Holden Cup, the NRL's Under-20s competition, also took place alongside the Premiership, with most matches held before the first grade competition. The Parramatta Eels picked up the wooden spoon for the second consecutive season after winning only five matches for the season.

Season summary

Cronulla-Sutherland Sharks supplements saga

The 2013 NRL season was marred by a major investigation involving the Cronulla-Sutherland Sharks' supplements program, which was alleged to have taken place during the 2011 season. Following an almost year-long investigation by ASADA and the NRL, a series of penalties were applied on the club, including, among others, the 12-month suspension of Shane Flanagan as the club's head coach, as well as a $1,000,000 fine (with $400,000 suspended) and the deregistration of Trent Elkin as the club's trainer.

Despite the off-field controversy, the Sharks were still able to reach the NRL finals for the second consecutive year, losing to eventual grand finalists Manly in the second week.

Teams
The lineup of teams remained unchanged for the 7th consecutive year. A report conducted by Brand Finance valued the Penrith Panthers club at $46.2m, the highest of any Australian sporting brand, while the Brisbane Broncos had the highest brand equity.

Ladder

Ladder progression

{| class="wikitable" style="text-align:center; line-height: 90%; font-size:90%;" width=100%
|-
! style="width:20px;" abbr="Position"|
!width=175 |Team
! style="width:20px;" abbr="Round 1"|1
! style="width:20px;" abbr="Round 2"|2
! style="width:20px;" abbr="Round 3"|3
! style="width:20px;" abbr="Round 4"|4
! style="width:20px;" abbr="Round 5"|5
! style="width:20px;" abbr="Round 6"|6
! style="width:20px;" abbr="Round 7"|7
! style="width:20px;" abbr="Round 8"|8
! style="width:20px;" abbr="Round 9"|9
! style="width:20px;" abbr="Round 10"|10
! style="width:20px;" abbr="Round 11"|11
! style="width:20px;" abbr="Round 12"|12
! style="width:20px;" abbr="Round 13"|13
! style="width:20px;" abbr="Round 14"|14
! style="width:20px;" abbr="Round 15"|15
! style="width:20px;" abbr="Round 16"|16
! style="width:20px;" abbr="Round 17"|17
! style="width:20px;" abbr="Round 18"|18
! style="width:20px;" abbr="Round 19"|19
! style="width:20px;" abbr="Round 20"|20
! style="width:20px;" abbr="Round 21"|21
! style="width:20px;" abbr="Round 22"|22
! style="width:20px;" abbr="Round 23"|23
! style="width:20px;" abbr="Round 24"|24
! style="width:20px;" abbr="Round 25"|25
! style="width:20px;" abbr="Round 26"|26
|-
|1|| style="text-align:left;"| Sydney || 0 || 2 || style="background:#cfc;"|4 || style="background:#cfc;"|6 || style="background:#cfc;"|6 || style="background:#cfc;"|8 || style="background:#cfc;"|10 || style="background:#cfc;"|12  || style="background:#cfc;"|14 || style="background:#cfc;"|16 || style="background:#cfc;"|16 || style="background:#cfc;"|18|| style="background:#cfc;"|20 || style="background:#cfc;"|20 || style="background:#cfc;"|22 || style="background:#cfc;"|24 || style="background:#cfc;"|26 || style="background:#cfc;"|28 || style="background:#cfc;"|30 || style="background:#cfc;"|32 || style="background:#9cf;"|34 || style="background:#9cf;"|36 || style="background:#9cf;"|38 || style="background:#9cf;"|38 || style="background:#cfc;"|38 || style="background:#9cf;"|40
|-
|2|| style="text-align:left;"| South Sydney || style="background:#cfc;"|2 || style="background:#cfc;"|4 || style="background:#cfc;"|6 || style="background:#cfc;"|8 || style="background:#cfc;"|10 || style="background:#cfc;"|10 || style="background:#cfc;"|12 || style="background:#cfc;"|14 || style="background:#9cf;"|16  || style="background:#9cf;"|18  || style="background:#9cf;"|18 || style="background:#9cf;"|20 || style="background:#9cf;"|22 || style="background:#9cf;"|24 || style="background:#9cf;"|26 || style="background:#9cf;"|28 || style="background:#9cf;"|30 || style="background:#9cf;"|32 || style="background:#9cf;"|32 || style="background:#9cf;"|34|| style="background:#cfc;"|34 || style="background:#cfc;"|34 || style="background:#cfc;"|36 || style="background:#cfc;"|38 || style="background:#9cf;"|40 || style="background:#cfc;"|40
|-
|3|| style="text-align:left;"| Melbourne  || style="background:#cfc;"|2 || style="background:#9cf;"|4 || style="background:#9cf;"|6 || style="background:#9cf;"|8 || style="background:#9cf;"|10 || style="background:#9cf;"|12 || style="background:#9cf;"|14  || style="background:#9cf;"|14 || style="background:#cfc;"|14 || style="background:#cfc;"|15 || style="background:#cfc;"|17 || style="background:#cfc;"|19 || style="background:#cfc;"|21 || style="background:#cfc;"|23 || style="background:#cfc;"|23 || style="background:#cfc;"|23 || style="background:#cfc;"|25 || style="background:#cfc;"|25 || style="background:#cfc;"|27|| style="background:#cfc;"|27 || style="background:#cfc;"|29 || style="background:#cfc;"|31 || style="background:#cfc;"|33 || style="background:#cfc;"|35 || style="background:#cfc;"|35 || style="background:#cfc;"|37
|-
|4|| style="text-align:left;"| Manly-Warringah || style="background:#cfc;"|2 || style="background:#cfc;"|4 || style="background:#cfc;"|4 || style="background:#cfc;"|6 || style="background:#cfc;"|8 || style="background:#cfc;"|10 || style="background:#cfc;"|10 || style="background:#cfc;"|12  || style="background:#cfc;"|12 || style="background:#cfc;"|13 || style="background:#cfc;"|15 || style="background:#cfc;"|17 || style="background:#cfc;"|17 || style="background:#cfc;"|17 || style="background:#cfc;"|19|| style="background:#cfc;"|19 || style="background:#cfc;"|21 || style="background:#cfc;"|23 || style="background:#cfc;"|25|| style="background:#cfc;"|27 || style="background:#cfc;"|29 || style="background:#cfc;"|31 || style="background:#cfc;"|31 || style="background:#cfc;"|33 || style="background:#cfc;"|35 || style="background:#cfc;"|35
|-
|5|| style="text-align:left;"| Cronulla-Sutherland || style="background:#cfc;"|2 || style="background:#cfc;"|2  || style="background:#cfc;"|4 || style="background:#cfc;"|4  || style="background:#cfc;"|4  || 4 || 4 || 6 || 8 || style="background:#cfc;"|10 || style="background:#cfc;"|12 || style="background:#cfc;"|14 || style="background:#cfc;"|14  || style="background:#cfc;"|16 || style="background:#cfc;"|18 || style="background:#cfc;"|18 || style="background:#cfc;"|20 || style="background:#cfc;"|22 || style="background:#cfc;"|22|| style="background:#cfc;"|24 || style="background:#cfc;"|26 || style="background:#cfc;"|26 || style="background:#cfc;"|28 || style="background:#cfc;"|30 || style="background:#cfc;"|30 || style="background:#cfc;"|32
|-
|6|| style="text-align:left;"| Canterbury-Bankstown || 0 || 2 || 2 || 2 || 2 || style="background:#fcc;"|2  || 4 || 6 || 8 || 8 || 10 || 12 || style="background:#cfc;"|14  || style="background:#cfc;"|16 || style="background:#cfc;"|16 || style="background:#cfc;"|18 || 18 || style="background:#cfc;"|20 || style="background:#cfc;"|22|| style="background:#cfc;"|24 || style="background:#cfc;"|26 || style="background:#cfc;"|26 || style="background:#cfc;"|28 || style="background:#cfc;"|28 || style="background:#cfc;"|30 || style="background:#cfc;"|30
|-
|7|| style="text-align:left;"| Newcastle || style="background:#9cf;"|2 || 2 || style="background:#cfc;"|4 || style="background:#cfc;"|6 || style="background:#cfc;"|6 || style="background:#cfc;"|8 || style="background:#cfc;"|10  || style="background:#cfc;"|10 || style="background:#cfc;"|10 || style="background:#cfc;"|12 || style="background:#cfc;"|12 || style="background:#cfc;"|12 || 12 || 12 || 14  || style="background:#cfc;"|16 || style="background:#cfc;"|18 || style="background:#cfc;"|20 || style="background:#cfc;"|22 || style="background:#cfc;"|22 || style="background:#cfc;"|23 || style="background:#cfc;"|25 || style="background:#cfc;"|25 || style="background:#cfc;"|25 || style="background:#cfc;"|27 || style="background:#cfc;"|29
|-
|8|| style="text-align:left;"| North Queensland || style="background:#cfc;"|2 || 2 || 2 || 2 || 4 || 4 || style="background:#cfc;"|6  || style="background:#cfc;"|8   || 8 || 8 || 8 || 8 || 8 || 10 || 12 || 14 || 14 || 14 || 16 || 16 || 18 || 20 || 22 || style="background:#cfc;"|24 || style="background:#cfc;"|26 || style="background:#cfc;"|28
|-
|9|| style="text-align:left;"| Gold Coast || 0 || style="background:#cfc;"|2 || style="background:#cfc;"|4 || style="background:#cfc;"|6 || style="background:#cfc;"|6 || style="background:#cfc;"|8 || style="background:#cfc;"|8 || style="background:#cfc;"|8 || style="background:#cfc;"|10 || style="background:#cfc;"|10 || style="background:#cfc;"|12 || style="background:#cfc;"|14 || style="background:#cfc;"|16  || style="background:#cfc;"|16|| style="background:#cfc;"|18 || style="background:#cfc;"|18 || style="background:#cfc;"|18 || 20 || 20 || 20 || 22 || style="background:#cfc;"|24 || style="background:#cfc;"|24 || 24 || 26 || 26
|-
|10|| style="text-align:left;"| Penrith || style="background:#cfc;"|2 || style="background:#cfc;"|2 || 2 || 2 || 2 || 2 || 4 || 4 || 6 || 8 || style="background:#cfc;"|10 || style="background:#cfc;"|12 || 12 || 12 || 14  || 16 || style="background:#cfc;"|18 || style="background:#cfc;"|20 || 20 || 20 || 20 || 20 || 22 || 24 || 24 || 26
|-
|11|| style="text-align:left;"| New Zealand || 0 || 0 || style="background:#fcc;"|0 || 2 || style="background:#fcc;"|2  || 2 || style="background:#fcc;"|2  || 4 || 4 || 4 || 6 || 8 || 10 || 12 || 14 || 16 || 16 || 18 || 20 || 22 || 22 || 22 || 22 || 24 || 26 || 26
|-
|12|| style="text-align:left;"| Brisbane || 0 || style="background:#cfc;"|2 || 2 || 2 || style="background:#cfc;"|4 || style="background:#cfc;"|6 || style="background:#cfc;"|8  || style="background:#cfc;"|8  || style="background:#cfc;"|8   || style="background:#cfc;"|10  || 10 || 10 || 10 || 12 || 14 || 14 || 14 || 14 ||16|| 18 || 19 || 21 || 23 || 23 || 23 || 25
|-
|13|| style="text-align:left;"| Canberra || 0 || style="background:#fcc;"|0 || 2 || style="background:#fcc;"|2 || 4 || 6 || 6 || 8 || style="background:#cfc;"|10  || 10 || 10 || 12 || style="background:#cfc;"|14  || style="background:#cfc;"|16 || style="background:#cfc;"|16 || 16 || 18 || 20 || style="background:#cfc;"|22|| style="background:#cfc;"|24 || style="background:#cfc;"|24 || 24 || 24 || 24 || 24 || 24
|-
|14|| style="text-align:left;"| St. George Illawarra || 0 || 0 || 0 || 2 || 4 || style="background:#cfc;"|6 || 6 || 6 || 6 || 8 || 8 || 8 || 10 || 10 || 12 || 12 || 12 || 14|| 16 || 16 || 16 || 16 || 16 || 16 || 16 || 18
|-
|15|| style="text-align:left;"| Wests || style="background:#fcc;"|0 || 2 || style="background:#cfc;"|4 || style="background:#cfc;"|4  || 4 || 4 || 4 || style="background:#fcc;"|4 || style="background:#fcc;"|4 || style="background:#fcc;"|4 || style="background:#fcc;"|6 || style="background:#fcc;"|8 || 10 || 10 || 12 || 14 || 14 || 16 || 16 || 16 || 16 || 16 || 16 || 18 || 18 || 18
|-
|16|| style="text-align:left;"| Parramatta || style="background:#cfc;"|2 || style="background:#cfc;"|2  || 2 || 2 || 4 || 4 || 4 || 4 || 6 || 6 || 6 || 8 || style="background:#fcc;"|8  || style="background:#fcc;"|8 || style="background:#fcc;"|8 || style="background:#fcc;"|10|| style="background:#fcc;"|10 || style="background:#fcc;"|10 || style="background:#fcc;"|10|| style="background:#fcc;"|10 || style="background:#fcc;"|10 || style="background:#fcc;"|12 || style="background:#fcc;"|12 || style="background:#fcc;"|12 || style="background:#fcc;"|14 || style="background:#fcc;"|14
|}

Finals series
For the second year the NRL uses the finals system previously implemented by the ARL competition from the 1990s (also used as the AFL final eight system) to decide the grand finalists from the top eight finishing teams. Both the seventh-placed Newcastle Knights and minor premiers Sydney Roosters return the finals after last featuring respectively in 2011 and 2010, whilst the other six teams (Bulldogs, Storm, Rabbitohs, Sea Eagles, Cowboys & Sharks) were featured in the preceding finals series.

Chart

Grand final

Regular season player statistics
The following statistics are of the conclusion of round 26.

Top 5 point scorers

Top 5 try scorers

Top 5 goal scorers

2013 Transfers

Players

Coaches

References